XKL, LLC, is an American company that develops optical transport networking technologies.  See Optical Transport Network. Founded in 1991 and based in Redmond, Washington, XKL is led by Cisco Systems co-founder Len Bosack.

History of XKL
In its earliest days XKL developed, and in 1995 introduced, the TOAD-1, a compact, modern replacement for PDP-10 systems, mainframe computer systems that had gone out of production.

Products

Current Products
Products include transponder, muxponder, mux/demux (multiplexing/demultiplexing) and (optical) amplifier models.

DarkStar DQT10 Transponder
Supports 12, 24 or 36 10G channels.

DarkStar DQT100 Transponder
Aggregates up to 96 100G channels onto a single pair of fibers.

DarkStar DQT400 Transponder
Aggregates up to 48 100G / 400G channels

DarkStar DQM100 Muxponder
Aggregates up to 12 100G channels via statistical multiplexing.

DarkStar DQM10 Muxponder
Aggregates up to 36 10G channels.

DarkStar DSM10-10 Muxponder
Aggregates up to 100G services.

DarkStar DXM
First released in 2007, the Darkstar DXM is a high-performance optical switch first installed at the California Institute of Technology as part of their Supercomputing Bandwidth Challenge. It provides 5 times the bandwidth, in excess of 100 Gigabits/sec, than the existing system but is also smaller and uses less power.

Historical Products

TOAD-1
The TOAD-1 System, also known as TD-1, was announced in 1993 and built as an extended version of the DECSYSTEM-20 from Digital Equipment Corporation. The original inspiration was to build a desktop version of the popular PDP-10 and the name began as an acronym for "Ten On A Desk". It was eventually built at XKL by veteran engineers from Cisco, DEC, Hewlett-Packard, and CDC.

It was the first XKL product produced and it became available for purchase in late 1995. The TOAD-1 is a high-performance I/O oriented system with a 36-bit processor running TOPS-20. It is a 36-bit multi-user system that can provide service to over 100 users at a time. The TOAD-1 architecture incorporates modern peripherals, and open bus architecture, expanded physical and virtual memory while maintaining the TOPS-20 user environment.

TOAD-2
The TOAD-2 was built to replace the TOAD-1. It is a single chip reimplementation used as redundant control processors in networking equipment from XKL. It can be configured for TOPS-20 timesharing.

See also
Other companies that produced PDP-10 compatible computers:
 Foonly
 Systems Concepts

Notes

References

External links

Login into the Living Computer Museum, a portal into the Paul Allen collection of timesharing and interactive computers, including an operational XKL TOAD-2

American companies established in 1991